Kim Seul-ki also known as Kim Seul-gi (born October 10, 1991) is a South Korean actress who starred in many critically acclaimed dramas including Oh My Ghost (2015), Splash Love (2015), and The Guardians (2017). She is also a former cast member of tvN's entertainment show SNL Korea.

Career
Hailing from Busan, Kim enjoyed making people laugh from an early age. According to an interview, during her third year of high school, she started to prepare for a career of professional acting, to overcome a broken heart. She eventually attended the Seoul Institute of the Arts, a leading university for arts and entertainment in South Korea. In 2011, she participated in a 30th anniversary memorial play on a college society called Venture to Meet, with Jang Jin, a well-known film director. Months later in mid-2011, when Jang Jin was looking for cast members for the live comic variety show called SNL Korea, he recruited Kim as a cast member. While gaining support on this experimental live programme consistently, her popularity significantly increased, especially in the latter half of 2012.

She is a member of both as so-called "Jang Jin's Division", a group of entertainers who have been influenced by Jang Jin, and part of his entertainment company called Film-it-suda.

Filmography

Film

Television series

Variety show

Notable characters on SNL Korea
 Kim Seul-gi (herself), a challenger of Korea's Next Top Cutie, a parody of Korea's Next Top Model
 Yoo Seung-woo, famed top 6 contestant on the 4th season of Superstar K
 Tto, a parody of Po on the BBC's programme Teletubbies; also one of a character on Yeouido Teletubbies for Season 2 and 3, weekly summaries of the 2012 presidential election campaign and Global Teletubbies for Season 4
 Candidate Ms. Lee, on Babysitter Interview, a parody of 2012 presidential election TV debates
 Wife-role of Park Jae-beom, a parody of Eminem's music video, "Love the Way You Lie", as a 'SNL Digital Short' (Korean edition)
 Moderator of Golf Academy, alongside imitated PGA Master Shin Dong-yeob and his guest Hong Seok-cheon
 Song Ae-gyo (means Ms. Song the Charm), a parody of Song Hye-kyo's That Winter, the Wind Blows, on Dr. Jekyll's Clinic
 Surgeon Bong Da-ri, a parody of Surgeon Bong Dal-hee with its main cast Lee Beom-soo
 Manager Kim Mi-yeong, on Voice Phishing Korea, a parody of Mnet's The Voice of Korea 
 Woman No. 1, as Congressperson's assaulter-role on Jjaak: Prisoners' Edition, a parody of Korean matching-show Jjak on SBS
 Yoga-instructor on Midnight Yoga, alongside actor Oh Ji-ho as her trainee
 Various SNL Korea's satirical advertisements for anticipated small businesses

Web shows

Other
 2013: tvN Paik Ji-yeon's People Inside, interview of SNL Korea's crew, alongside Kim Min-kyo, Jeong Seong-ho, and Jeong Myeong-ok (Episode 353 on May 1)
 2013: tvN Active Talk Show: Taxi, alongside Park Jae-beom (April 8)
 2013: Mnet Music Triangle, as singer and interviewee of a song "I Woke Up Because of You" (March 6)
 2013: SBS TV Entertainment Tonight, as "4 New-trendsetters of 2013" (February 27)
 2013: Mnet Wide Entertainment News, as "Hidden card(highly anticipated entertainer) of the year 2013" (January 9)
 2012: EBS Mother-story: Director Jang Jin and his mother, appeared during a preparation of Clumsy people with Kim Min-kyo (Episode 30 on September 28)

Stage

Musicals

Theater

Discography

Singles

Music video appearances

Awards and nominations

See more 

 Ahn Jae Hyeon
 Paulina Goto
 Jack - J97

References

External links
 
 Official fansite, "WooSeulSaeng" 

South Korean television actresses
South Korean stage actresses
South Korean film actresses
South Korean web series actresses
Actresses from Busan
1991 births
Living people